Cronaca del luogo (Chronicle of the Place) is an opera by Luciano Berio. The Italian libretto was compiled by his wife, Talia Pecker Berio, incorporating excerpts from Rabbinic literature and the poetry of Paul Celan and Marina Tsvetayeva. Berio himself described the work as an azione musicale (musical action) rather than an opera. It falls into five scenes and a prologue. The work received its premiere at the Felsenreitschule, Salzburg, on 24 July 1999, directed by Claus Guth. Sylvain Cambreling conducted the soloists, the Tölzer Knabenchor and Arnold Schoenberg Chor, Centro Tempo Reale for the live electronics and the ensemble Klangforum Wien.

Roles

References

External links 
 Entry in the Salzburg Festival Archive

Operas by Luciano Berio
1999 operas
Italian-language operas
Operas